VH1 Family Reunion: Love & Hip Hop Edition is an American reality television series featuring cast members from all four Love & Hip Hop cities. The series premiered on February 8, 2021, on VH1 as a crossover spin-off of Love & Hip Hop: New York, Love & Hip Hop: Atlanta, Love & Hip Hop: Hollywood and Love & Hip Hop: Miami.

It is the first Love & Hip Hop production to be produced in house by MTV Entertainment Studios, with no involvement from Mona Scott-Young and her company Monami Productions.

Development
In early 2020, production on the Love & Hip Hop franchise was shut down due to the COVID-19 pandemic, forcing the series off air for the first time in 6 years. On June 12, 2020, VH1 announced that they had severed their relationship with Big Fish Entertainment, after their reality show Live PD was canceled due to the handling of the video footage of the killing of Javier Ambler.

On October 8, 2020, Mona Scott-Young confirmed VH1 were working on a reimagining of the franchise, to be produced in-house. On December 3, 2020, it was reported that two new spin-offs were in production and set to premiere in 2021, one features various couples from the franchise's history, and another featuring cast members from Love & Hip Hop: Atlanta, Hollywood and Miami living together in an Arizona hotel.

On December 10, 2020, VH1 announced the four part special Love & Hip Hop: Secrets Unlocked, a reunion special hosted by Kendall Kyndall and featuring cast members from New York, Atlanta, Hollywood and Miami. The special premiered on January 4, 2021. On January 12, 2021, VH1 announced Love & Hip Hop: It's a Love Thing, a special featuring various Love & Hip Hop couples, would air on February 1, 2021, followed by VH1 Family Reunion: Love & Hip Hop Edition, an spin-off show featuring cast members from New York, Atlanta, Hollywood and Miami, on February 8.

Series synopsis

Overview and casting
The first season of VH1 Family Reunion: Love & Hip Hop Edition features Love & Hip Hop: New Yorks Yandy Smith-Harris, Jim Jones' former manager, her husband Mendeecees Harris and his mother Judy Harris, Love & Hip Hop: Atlantas Karlie Redd, Yung Joc, Lil Scrappy, his wife Adiz "Bambi" Benson, his mother Momma Dee, his baby mama Erica Dixon, and beauty shop owner Sierra Gates, Love & Hip Hop: Hollywoods Ray J, Lil' Fizz, Omarion's baby mama Apryl Jones, and K. Michelle's former assistant Paris Phillips, and Love & Hip Hop: Miami Trina, Trick Daddy and his ex-wife Joy Young.

The series also features Trick's 19-year-old son Jayden Young, Joc's 20-year-old son Amoni Robinson, and Karlie's 26-year-old daughter Jasmine Ellis, as well as guest appearances from Tamika D. Mallory, social justice leader and co-founder of social justice organization Until Freedom, and hip-hop artist and activist Mysonne.

The second season features Love & Hip Hop: New Yorks Rich Dollaz, Olivia's former manager, Juelz Santana and his wife Kimbella Vanderhee, Peter Gunz and his baby mothers Amina Buddafly and Tara Wallace, Joe Budden's baby mama Cyn Santana, producer Cisco Rosado and stylist Jonathan Fernandez, Love & Hip Hop: Atlantas Mimi Faust and her baby daddy Stevie J, Erica Mena, Shekinah Jo Anderson, former best friend of Tiny Harris, and Safaree Samuels, Love & Hip Hop: Hollywoods Brooke Valentine and her husband Marcus Black, Daniel "Booby" Gibson, stylist Zellswag and Yo-Yo, and Love & Hip Hop: Miami Bobby Lytes, Trina's cousin. Later, Hollywoods Paris Phillips returns from last season.

The third season features Love & Hip Hop: New Yorks Jim Jones, his fiancée Chrissy Lampkin and mother Nancy "Mama" Jones, Mariahlynn, Phresher and his wife Jenn Coreano, Love & Hip Hop: Atlantas Karen "KK" King and her son Scrapp DeLeon, Spice, Tokyo Vanity, Estelita Quintero and Alexis Skyy, Love & Hip Hop: Hollywoods Teairra Mari, Nikki Mudarris and Lyrica Anderson, Love & Hip Hop: Miami Amara La Negra, Gunplay, Shay Johnson and her brother Emjay Johnson, Miami Tip, Khaotic and Sukihana. Atlantas Karlie Redd, Shekinah Jo and Safaree, and Miamis Trick Daddy return from previous seasons.

Cast

In the first season, Trick Daddy's son Jayden Young, Yung Joc's Amoni Robinson and Karlie Redd's daughter Jasmine Ellis appear in supporting roles and in green screen confessional segments with the other cast members.

Episodes

Series overview

Season 1 (2021)

Season 2 (2021–22)

Season 3 (2022–23)

References

External links
 

Love & Hip Hop
2020s American reality television series
2021 American television series debuts
African-American reality television series
American television spin-offs
English-language television shows
Reality television spin-offs
VH1 original programming